The Netherlands–Philippines relations refers to the bilateral relations between the Netherlands and the Philippines.

History

Early relations between the Netherlands and the Philippines can be traced as early as the 17th century when a Dutch warship raided Spanish outpost in the Philippines, until the independence of the Netherlands was acknowledged in the mid-17th century. Underground trade between the Dutch East Indies and the Philippines was mostly tolerated until the formalization of economic trade in 1866, with the establishment of a Dutch honorary consulate in Manila, with G. van Polanen Petel as the first honorary consul.

The Philippines established its embassy in the Hague in May 1960, with the first Philippine ambassador presenting credentials to Queen Juliana.

Economic relations
As of 2014, the Netherlands is the 3rd biggest investor in the Philippines and the 10th largest export  partner of the Southeast Asian country.

Security ties
The Dutch Foreign Ministry stated in their website that the only irritant in the relations between the Netherlands and the Philippines is the presence of what they called the said Philippine Communist leadership in Utrecht.

See also
Foreign relations of the Netherlands
Foreign relations of the Philippines
Filipinos in the Netherlands

References 

 
Bilateral relations of the Philippines
Philippines